À Coeur Léger Sommeil Sanglant [sic] (loosely translated from French as "To light heart, bloody slumber") is the official debut studio album by Montreal-based instrumental shoegaze band Destroyalldreamers, released in November 2004 on Where Are My records. The album has received generally favourable reviews and was often put among the favourites of independent magazine and webzine critics of 2004.

The album was recorded by Patrick Lacharité in his apartment, in Montreal, over the course of four months in 2003 and 2004.

Track listing

Personnel

Destroyalldreamers
 Eric Quach – guitar, cover art
 Mathieu Grisé – guitar
 Michèle Martin – bass
 Shaun Doré – drums

Production
 Patrick Lacharité – recording, mixing, artwork design
 Mike Baker – mastering

References

External links
Album Page on Where Are My Records Website

2004 albums
Destroyalldreamers albums